Baya Bouzar (|13 September 1952), known by the stage name Biyouna is an Algerian singer, dancer, actress born in Belcourt, now known as Belouizdad, Algiers, Algeria.

Early life
Having a very early passion for singing, she was a member of several groups: first in Fadhéla Dziria's group where she played tambourine, another that she directed with her partner Flifla, and finally her own where she was the main vocalist and became sought after for wedding receptions.

At the age of 17, she began performing in some of the biggest cabarets in the city and at 19 started dancing at the Copacabana.

Acting career
That same year, the director Mustapha Badie gave her a singing part in his first soap opera, La Grande Maison (1973), where she played Fatma. This show was adapted from a novel by Mohamed Dib. She became well-known thanks to this role.

She appeared in two Algerian films: Leila and the others, by Sid Ali Mazif in 1978, and The Neighbor, by Ghaouti Bendedouche in 2000. She also performed some one-woman shows.

In 1999, Nadir Moknèche offered her the role of Meriem in Madame Osmane's Harem which she produced in France. This film was followed by Viva Laldjéri in 2003.

Between 2002 and 2005, Biyouna had success with a trilogy based on the theme of Ramadan called 'Nass Mlah City.She appeared in the last film of Nadir Moknèche, Délice Paloma, where she played the main character, a mafiosa named Madame Aldjeria. In 2006 she performed the role of Coryphée in Sophocles' Elektra beside Jane Birkin in an opera directed by Philippe Calvaio. In 2007 she had a small role in the Algerian film Rendez-vous avec le destin. 

In 2009, she played La Celestina at the Vingtième Théâtre in Paris. For Ramadan, 2010, Biyouna was one of the stars in a sitcom broadcast on Nessma TV, Nsibti Laaziza.

Musical career
Meanwhile, she was continuing her singing career and in 2001 issued the album Raid Zone, produced with the composer John Bagnolett. After the success of this album and her participation in Jérome Savary's Opéra de Casbah she brought out another album called Blonde dans la casbah.  She had been planning this album for some time. Biyouna took her time, carefully choosing a Franco-Algerian repertoire which explored both cultures.

She lives with her husband and four children in a suburb of Algiers.

Discography
2001: Raid Zone2007: Blonde dans la Casbah''

Singles
"Pamela" (2001)
"Les yeux noirs" (2002)
"In her eyes" (2002)
"Tu es ma vie" (2002)
"Maoudlik" (2003)
"Taali" (2006)
"Une Blonde Platine dans la Casbah "  (2007)
"Demain tu te maries" (2007)
"Merci pour tout (c'que j'n'ai pas)" (2007)
"El Bareh" (2008)
"Tsaabli ouetmili" (2008)

Filmography

Films

Television

Theater

References

External links
Biyouna
Delice Paloma
Biyouna, l'algéroise de Belcourt
Biyouna, une artiste en liberté
Portrait Mondomix Biyouna
Portrait Africulture

1952 births
Living people
Algerian film actresses
Musicians from Algiers
21st-century Algerian actresses
Algerian television actresses
Algerian stage actresses
20th-century Algerian actresses
20th-century Algerian  women singers
21st-century  Algerian women singers